The 2017–18 Coupe de France preliminary rounds Normandie make up the qualifying competition to decide which teams from the French Normandie region take part in the main competition from the seventh round

First round 
The matches in Normandy were played on 19, 20 and 27 August 2017.

First round results: Normandie

Second round 
These matches were played on 26, 27 and 31 August 2017.

Second round results: Normandie

Third round 
These matches were played on 9 and 10 September 2017.

Third round results: Normandie

Fourth round 
These matches were played on 23 and 24 September 2017.

Fourth round results: Normandie

Fifth round 
These matches were played on 7 and 8 October 2017.

Fifth round results: Normandie

Sixth round 
These matches were played on 21 and 22 October 2017.

Sixth round results: Normandie

References 

2017–18 Coupe de France
Football in Normandy